The Santa Fe de Luxe was the first extra-fare named passenger train on the Atchison, Topeka and Santa Fe Railway.

The de Luxe (meaning something luxurious, or elegant) started on December 12, 1911, on a seasonal weekly schedule between Chicago, Illinois, and Los Angeles, California. It was the first train the Santa Fe called "Extra Fast - Extra Fine - Extra Fare."  It was conceived by company president Edward Payson Ripley as the Santa Fe equivalent to the 20th Century Limited (New York Central) and Broadway Limited (Pennsylvania Railroad).

The trip took 63 hours each way and the sixty passengers paid a surcharge of $25 each way. Passengers could only board in Chicago, Los Angeles, Kansas City, or at Williams, Arizona (where those heading to the Grand Canyon boarded a train of the Grand Canyon Railway.

On arrival at Summit in Cajon Pass in California eastbound passengers were presented with orchid corsages (for the ladies) and engraved pigskin wallets (for the men).  On the westbound run, ladies received a bouquet of flowers and a basket of California oranges, while the men got the usual wallet.

The de Luxe was not essential to the war effort and was withdrawn on May 1, 1917.

Equipment used
It took the Pullman Company almost a year to design and build the 12 heavyweight steel underframe cars of the two identical consists of the de Luxe, one of which was:

 Baggage-Club-Lounge (also included a barber shop and library) #1328 San Gabriel
 Fred Harvey Company Diner #1434
 Sleeper (7 drawing rooms) Pima
 Sleeper (7 drawing rooms) Piute
 Sleeper (7 compartments, 2 drawing rooms) Vaca
 Sleeper (7 compartments, 2 drawing rooms) Walpi
 Observation-Parlor El Quivira

The cars were lavishly furnished and had electric lighting.  Drawing room passengers slept in brass beds instead of the usual berths.  The dining cars featured the first attempt at air conditioning on rail passenger cars; the dining room was cooled in the summer with large blocks of ice.

The trains were pulled by the best available of the road's passenger pool locomotives.  On the prairie districts of Illinois, Missouri and Kansas, most divisions saw fast 4-4-2 "Atlantic"-type engines assigned.  On many of the western mountain districts, 4-6-2 "Pacific"-type steam locomotives were used, with helpers added over the toughest grades.

See also
 Passenger train service on the Atchison, Topeka and Santa Fe Railway

References

External links
California State Railway Museum
Santa Fe Railway Historical & Modeling Society

Passenger trains of the Atchison, Topeka and Santa Fe Railway
Named passenger trains of the United States
Railway services introduced in 1911
Night trains of the United States
Railway services discontinued in 1917